Gowlalale (also spelt Gawlalaale) also spelt Gewlele is a town in the Misraq Gashamo woreda  in the Somali Region of Ethiopia. It is populated by the Reer Daahir sub-division of the Habr Je'lo Isaaq.

Demographics 
According to the 2007 census conducted by the Central Statistical Agency of Ethiopia (CSA) the town had a population of 4,538.

References 

Populated places in the Somali Region